John Verney may refer to:

John Verney, 1st Viscount Fermanagh (1640–1717), Irish peer, English MP for Buckinghamshire and Amersham
John Verney (politician) (c. 1652–1707), English MP for Leicestershire (UK Parliament constituency)
John Verney (judge) (1699–1741), British Master of the Rolls, MP for Downton
John Verney, 20th Baron Willoughby de Broke (1896–1986), British officer, Lord Lieutenant of Warwickshire
John Verney (author) (1913-1993), British author and illustrator